Celi may refer to:

Adolfo Celi (1922 –1986), Italian film actor and director
Ara Celi (born 1974), American actress
Celi Bee, American disco musician.
CELI, Certificato di Conoscenza della Lingua Italiana

See also
Celis (disambiguation)